The Rajputana Rifles is the oldest rifle regiment of the Indian Army. It was originally a part of the British Indian Army, when six previously existing regiments were amalgamated to form six battalions of the 6th Rajputana Rifles. In 1945, the numeral designation was dropped from the title and in 1947 the regiment was transferred to the newly independent Indian Army. Since independence, the regiment has been involved in a number of conflicts against Pakistan, as well as contributing to the Custodian Force (India) in Korea under the aegis of the United Nations in 1953–54 and to the UN Mission to the Congo in 1962. As a rifle regiment, it uses a bugle horn as its insignia, the same as the British Light Division, but unlike its British counterparts, the Rajputana Rifles march at the same march pace used in the Indian Army as a whole.

Etymology

The name Rajputana Rifles is derived from northwest, and the word Rajputana , a historic region in northwest India that is roughly coextensive with the modern Indian state of Rajasthan, as well as small sections of Madhya Pradesh and Gujarat. It is based on the word Rajaputra, meaning "son of a king, which came in 6th century.  The name Rajputana means "land of the Rajputs". The Aravalli Range crosses the southern part of the region from northeast to southwest. The northwestern part is largely the Thar desert, but to the southeast, the land is extremely fertile. Rajput power rose here between the 6th and 13th centuries, and the princes resisted the early Muslim incursions, which began in the 11th century. Rajput power reached its peak in the early 15th century, but the area fell to the Mughals when Akbar captured the Chittor Fort in 1568. But the Rajputana was safe due to mutual understanding with mughals.From their seat at Ajmer the Mughals ruled Rajputana until the early 18th century. The Marathas held feudatories in the region from c. 1750 to 1818, when it passed to Great Britain. When Britishers came Rajputs did treaty.The Rajput princely states came under British protection by treaties in the early 19th century; most of the area was formed into Rajasthan state in 1948. Under the British, Rajputana included more than 20 princely states, notably Bikaner, Jaipur, Jodhpur, Udaipur, and Ajmer. The internal autonomy of many of the states was guaranteed.

Recruitment
The Rajputana Rifles is a fixed class regiment with equal proportions of Jats  and Rajputs.

Lineage
The regiment's origins lie in the 18th century when the East India Company (HEIC) recruited Rajputs to protect its operations. The impressive performance of French local units which were composed of local recruits mixed with French officers, helped the HEIC to decide that it needed to do something similar. In January 1775, it raised its first local infantry units which included the 5th Battalion, Bombay Sepoys, which is considered to be the oldest rifle regiment of the Indian Army. The 5th Battalion was successively redesignated as 9th Battalion Bombay Sepoys in 1778; 2nd Battalion, 2nd Regiment of Bombay Native Infantry in 1796; 4th Regiment of Bombay Native Infantry in 1824, and then 4th Regiment Native Infantry (Rifle Corps) in 1881. It thus became the first rifle regiment of the British Indian Army. In 1899 the battalion was once more renamed as 4th Regiment (1st Battalion Rifle Corps) Bombay Infantry and again in 1901 as 4th Bombay Rifles.

In Kitchener's 1903 reorganisation of the Indian Army, 4th Bombay Rifles became 104th Wellesley's Rifles, to commemorate the fact that the regiment had been commanded in 1800 by Arthur Wellesley (later the Duke of Wellington). In the further re-organisation in 1921, six regiments were brought together to form six battalions of the 6th Rajputana Rifles Regiment:

1st Battalion - 104th Wellesley's Rifles
2nd Battalion - 120th Rajputana Infantry
3rd Battalion - 122nd Rajputana Infantry
4th Battalion - 123rd Outram's Rifles
5th Battalion - 125th Napier's Rifles
10th (Training) Battalion - 13th Rajputs (The Shekhawati Regiment).
18th Battalion - (Saurashtra Rifles)

In 1945 the regiments of the British Indian Army dropped the numeral in their titles and so the Rajputana Rifles assumed its current name. In 1947 after the partition of India the regiment was allocated to the newly formed Indian Army. In 1949, the 1st battalion was transferred to the newly raised Brigade of the Guards, becoming the 3rd battalion, Brigade of the Guards.

History

In 1817 the 4th battalion met the Marathas at the Battle of Khadki. The defence earned the regiment the battle honor of "Khadki". In 1856–57 the 1st, 2nd, and 4th battalions were together in the Persian theatre of operations. In 1856 Capt. John Augustus Wood of the 2nd battalion (then the 20th Bombay Native Infantry) was awarded the Victoria Cross for storming Bushire Fort. This was the first Victoria Cross to be won in an Indian unit. Sub. Maj Mohammed Sharief and Sub. Peer Bhatt were recommended for the Victoria Cross for their actions in the same battle but were turned down as at that time the medal category was not open to Indians.

In 1878–1880, during the Second Afghan War, the 1st battalion marched 145 miles in 5 days from Quetta to Kandahar and laid siege to the city. In 1900–1902, the 3rd battalion was part of a force used to contain the Boxer Rebellion in China.

World War I saw the regiment fight in battlefields from France to Palestine. The 5th battalion was in all theatres of the war and participated in General Allenby’s march to recapture Jerusalem.

During World War II the regiment was expanded to thirteen battalions and served in the Middle East, Burma and Malaya. The 4th battalion had the distinction of earning two Victoria Crosses during this conflict.

Over the course of its existence, members of the regiment have received six Victoria Crosses, two Military Crosses, one Param Vir Chakra, three Ashok Chakras, one Padma Bhushan, fourteen Param Vishisht Seva Medals, ten Maha Vir Chakras, eleven Kirti Chakras, 18 Ati Vishisht Seva Medals, two Uttam Yudh Seva Medal, 50 Vir Chakras, 28 Shaurya Chakras, 122 Sena Medals (including Bar), 39 Vishisht Seva Medals, three Yudh Seva Medals, 85 Mentions-in-Dispatches and 55 Arjun Awards.

Units

2nd Battalion (formerly 120th Rajputana Infantry)
3rd Battalion (formerly 122nd Rajputana Infantry)
4th Battalion (formerly 123rd Outram's Rifles)
5th Battalion (formerly 125th Napier's Rifles)
6th Battalion (Param Vir Chakra Paltan)
7th Battalion (Mynamati Battalion)
8th Battalion
9th Battalion
11th Battalion
12th Battalion (formerly 31st Rajputana Rifles)
13th Battalion
14th Battalion
15th Battalion
16th Battalion
17th Battalion (former Imperial Service Troops)
 18th Battalion (former Saurashtra Rifles Nawanagar State Forces)
19th Battalion
20th Battalion
21st Battalion
22nd Battalion
 9 Rashtriya Rifles
 18 Rashtriya Rifles
 43 Rashtriya Rifles
 57 Rashtriya Rifles
Others:
1st Battalion is now 3rd Battalion, Brigade of the Guards
18th Battalion is now 11th Mechanised Infantry Regiment
23rd Battalion was transformed in 2013 into the 23rd Battalion, Parachute Regiment
105 Infantry Battalion (TA) Rajputana Rifles – Delhi Cantonment, New Delhi 
128 Infantry Battalion (TA) Rajputana Rifles Eco - Jaisalmer, Rajasthan

Alliances
 - The 22nd (Cheshire) Regiment; 5th Bn

Rajputana Rifles Regimental Museum
The Rajputana Rifles Regimental Museum in the Rajputana Rifles Centre is located inside the Delhi Cantonment. The museum covers the rich history of the regiment in the most modern fashion. The museum is around 7000 square feet in size and covers the history of the regiment from its inception. The museum exhibits weapons and uniforms and narrates the history through large format images and audiovisual film. The museum was designed and conceived by Holistic Design a Delhi-based design studio headed by Nikhil Bhardwaj who specializes in designing museums and exhibitions. Col. M. S. Niranjan of the 19th battalion was the director of the museum project. It is rated as the finest military museum in India and even compared to the Imperial War Museum in London.

Gallantry Awards

Lt. Col. (Brig.) Raghubir Singh Rajawat (vet. 1965 & 1971). Mahavir Chakra (1965 war), 18th Rajputana Rifles
Coy Hav. Maj. Piru Singh - Param Vir Chakra, 6 Raj Rif
Coy. Hav. Maj. Chhelu Ram - Victoria Cross, 6 Raj Rif
 Maj. Padmapani Acharya - Maha Vir Chakra, 2 Raj Rif
 Maj. Vivek Gupta - Maha Vir Chakra, 2 Raj Rif
Nk. Digendra Kumar - Maha Vir Chakra, 2 Raj Rif
 Capt. Neikezhakuo Kenguruse - Maha Vir Chakra, 2 Raj Rif
 Hav. Rajesh Kumar - Ashoka Chakra, 11 Raj Rif
 Nk. Neeraj Kumar Singh - Ashoka Chakra, 13 Raj Rif
 Capt. Umaid Singh - Ashoka Chakra, 19 Raj Rif
 Capt. (Later Col) Karni Singh Rathore - Kirti Chakra, 17 Raj Rif, (Sawaiman Guards)
 Maj (Later Brig) JK Tomar - Vir Chakra, 9 Raj Rif
 Capt. Vijayant Thapar - Vir Chakra, 2 Raj Rif
Col. Daljit Singh Randhawa - Military Cross, Vishisht Seva Medal, 5/6 Raj Rif
Lt. Gen. Abhay Krishna - Param Vishisht Seva Medal, Uttam Yudh Seva Medal, Ati Vishisht Seva Medal, Sena Medal, Vishisht Seva Medal
Col. Magod Basappa Ravindranath - Vir Chakra, 2 Raj Rif
Capt. Mohammed Haneef Uddin -Vir Chakra, 11 Raj Rif
Maj.Gen Shivkaran Alok Dubey Yudh Seva medal, Maha Vir Chakra, 22 Raj Rif
 Hav. Sugan Singh Maha Vir Chakra, 7 RAJ RIF
LNK NO 20976 IDSM 4TH OUTRMN'S RAJPUTANA RIFLES

References

 Singh, Colonel Dr Narendar  (2019) ''Third Battalion The Rajputana Rifles 'Waffadar Paltan' Volume 1 1818-1920 (New Delhi: Pentagon Press) 
 Singh, Colonel Dr Narendar  (2020) ''Third Battalion The Rajputana Rifles 'Gods Own' Volume 2 1921-2018 (New Delhi: Pentagon Press) 
 Brigadier Raghubir Singh Rajawat; https://www.tribuneindia.com/news/chandigarh/ww-2-veteran-and-mvc-recipient-in-1965-war%C2%A0brig-raghubir-singh%C2%A0passes-away-at-99-267922

External links
Rajputana Rifles on globalsecurity.org
Rajputana Rifles - L. N. Subramaniam

Military units and formations established in 1775
British Indian Army infantry regiments
R
Rifle regiments
Units of the Indian Peace Keeping Force